The Reform Party of Alberta is an active political party in Alberta founded in 2016 by Randy Thorsteinson. The party is not related to the former Reform Party of Alberta, which was de-registered by Elections Alberta in 2004, leaving the name available for a new party.

The party was founded as a social conservative alternative to Wildrose, which Thorsteinson describes as "middle of the road". The party's website lists parental authority, religious freedom, and the privatization of health care among its priorities.

Its first electoral test was the Calgary-Lougheed by-election won by Jason Kenney. Candidate Lauren Thorsteinson (Randy's daughter) finished fourth, ahead of Green Party leader Romy Tittel.

References

External links
Reform Party of Alberta

Political parties established in 2016
Provincial political parties in Alberta
Red Deer, Alberta
Social conservative parties
Conservative parties in Canada
2016 establishments in Alberta